British NVC community MG12 (Festuca arundinacea grassland) is one of the mesotrophic grassland communities in the British National Vegetation Classification system. It is one of three types of mesotrophic grassland classified as grass-dominated inundation communities.

It is a fairly localised coastal community. There are two subcommunities.

Community composition

The following constant species are found in this community:
 Creeping Bent (Agrostis stolonifera)
 Tall Fescue (Festuca arundinacea)
 Red Fescue (Festuca rubra)

No rare species are associated with this community.

Distribution

This community is exclusively coastal; it is mainly found on the south coast and western coasts of Britain, with an outlying site on the coast of Yorkshire.

Subcommunities

There are two subcommunities:
 the Lolium perenne - Holcus lanatus subcommunity
 the Oenanthe lachenalii subcommunity

References

 Rodwell, J. S. (1992) British Plant Communities Volume 3 - Grasslands and montane communities  (hardback),  (paperback)

MG12